Alert is an unincorporated community in northern Franklin County, North Carolina, United States. It is located northeast of Louisburg, at an elevation of 397 feet (121 m). The primary cross roads where the community is located are Alert Road (SR 1407), Pete Smith Road (SR 1412) and Alert-Gold Sand Road (SR 1407).

References

Unincorporated communities in Franklin County, North Carolina
Unincorporated communities in North Carolina